Funmi Olonisakin (born 8 February 1965) is a British Nigerian scholar, who is a Professor of leadership, peace and conflict at King's College London, and an Extra-Ordinary Professor at the University of Pretoria. She is the founder and former Director of the African Leadership Centre (ALC) founded on the principle of Pan-Africanism to build the next generation of leaders and scholars on the African continent with core transformational values. Olonisakin is the Programme Director of the ALC's Master of Science (MSc) programmes on Leadership, peace and security. She is a research associate of Political Sciences at the University of Pretoria, and was an Andrew Mellon Foundation distinguished scholar and a distinguished fellow of the Geneva Centre for Security Policy (GCSP). She is currently an appointed member of the United Nations Security Council (UNSC) advisory group of experts. on the review of the UN Peace-building Architecture.

Olonisakin is currently the Vice President/ Principal (International) of King's College London. She was previously the Vice-Dean International, Faculty of Social Science and Public Policy, King's College London, she is the first black female professor and the first black woman to deliver an inaugural lecture at King's College London.

Education 
Born in South London in a Nigerian family, 'Funmi (Oluwafunmilayo) Olonisakin obtained her first degree at the Obafemi Awolowo University, Ile-Ife, Nigeria, in Political Science (BSc). She went on to obtain her master's degree in War Studies as well as her PhD in War Studies at King's College London.

Career
In a career that spans many decades, Olonisakin has continued to build a critical mass movement of African leaders and scholars with intrinsic values that promote pan-Africanism on integrity, respect for diversity, pursue of excellence, engaging the youth agency in Africa and independent thinking. She advocates for closing the bridges between the academics, policies and practices. Through the African Leadership Centre (ALC), knowledge sharing and transfer especially through mentoring activities have been one of the ways that Olonisakin employed with the inclusion of several renowned mentors in the faculty to engage with the fellows of the ALC. Olonisakin recently stepped down as the Director of the ALC, while continuing to support the Centre in various capacities.

Aside from teaching, Olonisakin contributes to African peace and conflict debates, on which she has to her credit a wide ranges of publications. She is a founding member of the African Security Sector Network (ASSN) and served as its West African Regional Coordinator from 2008 until 2012. She served on the World Economic Forum's Global Agenda Council on Fragile States from 2008 to 2010 examining and evaluating how transformative leadership can have such lasting impact on governance and post-conflict reconstruction.

Olonisakin was once a staff of the United Nations, through the United Nations Special Representative of the Secretary-General on Children and Armed Conflict, where she managed the African unit. During her professional engagement in this role, "she facilitated the establishment of the National Commission for War Affected Children in Sierra Leone and the Child Protection Unit in the Economic Community of West African States (ECOWAS)." She has served many other roles with the African Union and ECOWAS especially in the women's in peace-building, governance, children in conflicts thematic areas. She was also the Director of the Conflict, Security and Development Group at King's College London from 2003 till 2013.

Waxing stronger in her chosen field to make indelible marks and prints in the world, Olonisakin is currently contributing her knowledge to the African Peace and Security Architecture as a member of the advisory group of experts for the Review of the UN Peacebuilding Architecture. She is on the Thabo Mbeki African Leadership Institute (TMALI) as International Advisory Board's member; the Geneva Centre for Democratic Control of Armed Forces (DCAF) board; the Tana High Level Forum on Security in Africa and on the Boards of Trustees of International Alert and the Centre for Humanitarian Dialogue.

Olonisakin is the first black woman to reach the professorship cadre at King's College, London, and has been named in the Powerlist of Britains most influential people of African origin, including in the Top 10 of the 2019 ranking, and inclusion in the following 2020 and 2021 editions.

Ideology
Olonisakin upholds a progressive, diverse and transformative approach to life. She thrives on evidence-based research and strongly promotes transformational leadership.

Selected publications

Books 
 Militancy and Violence in West Africa: Religion, Politics and Radicalization, ed.James Gow, Funmi Olonisakin & Ernst Dijxhoorn. London: Routledge, 2013. 
 Women and Security Governance in Africa, ed. Funmi Olonisakin & Awino Okech. Oxford: Pambazuka Press, 2011.  
 Women, Peace and Security: Translating Policy into Practice, ed. Funmi Olonisakin, Karen Barnes & Eka Ikpe. London: Routledge,2011.  
 Security Sector Transformation in Africa, ed. Alan Bryden & Funmi Olonisakin. Munster: Lit Verlag, 2010.  
 The Challenges of Security Sector Governance in West Africa, ed. Alan Bryden, Boubacar Ndiaye & Funmi Olonisakin. Munster: Lit Verlag, 2008. 
 Peacekeeping in Sierra Leone: The Story of UNAMSIL. Boulder and London: Lynne Reinner, 2008. 
 Global Development and Human Security, ed. Robert Picciotto, Funmi Olonisakin & Michael ClarkeNew Brunswick and London: Transaction Publishers, 2007. 
 A Handbook of Security Sector Governance in Afric], ed. Nicole Ball & Kayode Fayemi. London: Centre for Democracy and Development, 2004. 
 Reinventing Peacekeeping in Africa: Conceptual and Legal Issues in the ECOMOG Operations. The Hague: Kluwer Law International, 2000.   
 Engaging Sierra Leone. London: Centre for Democracy and Development, 2000. 
 Peacekeepers, Politicians and Warlords, by Abiodun Alao, Funmi Olonisakin & John Mackinlay Tokyo: United Nations University Press, 1999.

References

External links 
 African Leadership Centre
 King's College London
 African Security Sector Network

Academics of King's College London
Nigerian officials of the United Nations
African Union
Living people
Nigerian expatriates in the United Kingdom
Obafemi Awolowo University alumni
Nigerian feminists
Nigerian women academics
Yoruba women academics
Alumni of King's College London
Nigerian scholars
1965 births
Fellows of King's College London